Trudi Maree (born 9 August 1988) is a South African swimmer. She was born in Bloemfontein. She competed in the women's 50m freestyle at the 2012 Summer Olympics in London, finishing with a time of 25.78 seconds in 36th place in the heats.

References

External links
 

1988 births
Living people
Sportspeople from Bloemfontein
South African female swimmers
Olympic swimmers of South Africa
Swimmers at the 2012 Summer Olympics
South African female freestyle swimmers
Swimmers at the 2014 Commonwealth Games
Commonwealth Games competitors for South Africa
20th-century South African women
21st-century South African women